The National Environmental Policy Act (NEPA) is a 1970  environmental law of the United States.

NEPA may also refer to:

Organisms 
 Nepa (insect), a genus of aquatic insects
 Nepa (plant), a genus of legumes

Organizations 
 National Electric Power Authority in Nigeria, the Power Holdings Company of Nigeria
 National Economic Protectionism Association, a non-government organization of the Philippines
 NEPA Lagos F.C., a Nigerian association football team
 NEPA Breakers, an American Basketball Association team
 National Environment and Planning Agency, Jamaica's environmental regulatory agency

Places 
 Nepa (Martian crater), a crater on Mars
 Nepa (village), a locality in Nepal
 Nepa Kingdom, a mountainous kingdom mentioned in the Mahabharata
 Nepa, the historical name of Nepal as mentioned in the Ramayana
 Nepa (river), a tributary of the Nizhnyaya Tunguska in Russia
 Nepa Valley, historical name for Kathmandu Valley
 Northeastern Pennsylvania, region roughly synonymous with the Coal Region

Other uses 
 Nuclear Energy for the Propulsion of Aircraft, United States Army Air Forces project
 Stefano Nepa (born 2001), Italian motorcycle rider

See also